Tall Roshtan (also Romanized as Tall Roshtān) is a village in Deris Rural District, in the Central District of Kazerun County, Fars Province, Iran. At the 2006 census, its population was 440, in 83 families.

References 

Populated places in Kazerun County